Crown Heights is a hamlet and census-designated place (CDP) in Dutchess County, New York, United States. The population was 2,840 at the 2010 census. It is part of the Poughkeepsie–Newburgh–Middletown, NY Metropolitan Statistical Area as well as the larger New York–Newark–Bridgeport, NY-NJ-CT-PA Combined Statistical Area.

Crown Heights is in the town of Poughkeepsie.

Geography
Crown Heights is located at  (41.639978, -73.931929), in the south-central part of the town of Poughkeepsie. U.S. Route 9 forms the eastern edge of the CDP and leads north  to downtown Poughkeepsie and south  to Wappingers Falls.

Demographics

As of the census of 2000, there were 2,992 people, 1,019 households, and 814 families residing in the CDP. The population density was 1,398.3 per square mile (539.8/km2). There were 1,045 housing units at an average density of 488.4/sq mi (188.5/km2). The racial makeup of the CDP was 82.92% White, 9.09% African American, 4.38% Asian, 1.84% from other races, and 1.77% from two or more races. Hispanic or Latino of any race were 6.55% of the population.

There were 1,019 households, out of which 40.8% had children under the age of 18 living with them, 64.0% were married couples living together, 11.3% had a female householder with no husband present, and 20.1% were non-families. 16.8% of all households were made up of individuals, and 6.5% had someone living alone who was 65 years of age or older. The average household size was 2.93 and the average family size was 3.29.

In the CDP, the population was spread out, with 29.2% under the age of 18, 5.7% from 18 to 24, 30.4% from 25 to 44, 22.4% from 45 to 64, and 12.3% who were 65 years of age or older. The median age was 37 years. For every 100 females, there were 96.3 males. For every 100 females age 18 and over, there were 94.9 males.

The median income for a household in the CDP was $60,994, and the median income for a family was $67,019. Males had a median income of $44,511 versus $33,281 for females. The per capita income for the CDP was $22,149. About 1.5% of families and 2.0% of the population were below the poverty line, including 3.0% of those under age 18 and 2.7% of those age 65 or over.

References

Poughkeepsie, New York
Census-designated places in New York (state)
Hamlets in New York (state)
Poughkeepsie–Newburgh–Middletown metropolitan area
Census-designated places in Dutchess County, New York
Hamlets in Dutchess County, New York
New York (state) populated places on the Hudson River